Kinyon may refer to:
Kinyon, California, former name of White Horse, California
Jon Kinyon (born 1962), American filmmaker and songwriter
William R. Kinyon (1833–1904), American politician